Inger Hagerup (née Halsør; 12 April 1905, in Bergen – 6 February 1985, in Fredrikstad) was a Norwegian writer, playwright and poet. She is considered one of the greatest Norwegian poets of the 20th century.

Life and career

Inger Johanne Halsør was born in Bergen, Norway. Her father died when she was five years old. For several years, her family  moved around, until they settled in Nordfjord and later in Volda. In 1931, she married Anders Askevold Hagerup (1904–1979), who was a teacher, translator and children's book author. They settled at Haugerud, Oslo, and became the parents of two distinguished Norwegian authors, Klaus Hagerup and Helge Hagerup. Her son, Klaus  Hagerup wrote extensively about his mother in Alt er så nær meg: Om Inger Hagerup. 

Inger Hagerup is mostly known for her lyric poetry, but has also been recognized for writing many important theatrical pieces. Hagerup published her first poetry collection, Jeg gikk meg vill i skogene, in 1939.

While studying in Trondheim she was also a member of the Communist organisation Mot Dag. Both Inger Hagerup and her husband Anders participated in resistance activities during the occupation of Norway by Nazi Germany and in 1943 they fled to Sweden. She was known for opposing the German occupation, writing many lyrics against what she saw as a brutal and careless enemy, such as in "Aust Vågøy". The latter was inspired by an incident that occurred in the Second World War. The Nazis retaliated against locals after a successful British raid-attack in March 1941 in the Lofoten Islands. Many Norwegians can recite from memory the first lines,  De brente våre gårder. De drepte våre menn. La våre hjerter hamre det om og om igjen.  ("They burned our houses. They killed our men. Let our hearts pound it, over and over again).

In 1944 she was awarded the Gyldendal's Endowment, the Sarpsborg Prize in 1955 and in 1962 Inger Hagerup was recognized with the Dobloug Prize. She died in Fredrikstad, Østfold on 6 February 1985.

Her poem "Två tungor" (Two tongues) has been sung by Fred Åkerström on his 1972 album of that name, and by Sofia Karlsson on her 2007 album Visor från vinden.

Selected works
 Jeg gikk meg vill i skogene, 1939
 Flukten til Amerika, 1942
 Videre, Stockholm 1944, Oslo 1945
 Lykke , 1945
 Den syvende natt, 1947
 Sånn vil du ha meg. 30 utvalgte dikt om kjærlighet, 1949
 Så rart (children's poetry), 1950
 Mitt skip seiler, 1951
 Hilsen fra Katarina, 1953
 Drømmeboken, 1955
 Den tredje utvei (drama), 1956
 Strofe med vinden,  1958
 Lille Persille (children's poetry), 1961
 Fra hjertets krater, 1964
 Dikt i utvalg, 1965
 Det kommer en pike gående, 1965
 Hva skal du her nede?, 1966
 Trekkfuglene og skjæra, 1967
 Ut og søke tjeneste, 1968
 Østenfor kjærlighet, vestenfor drøm (short stories), edited by Karin Beate Vold, 1977
 Samlede dikt, 1985

References

Other sources
Hagerup, Klaus  (1988) Alt er sa nær meg: Om Inger Hagerup (Oslo: Aschehoug) 
Hagerup, Inger: Karin Beate Vold, and Jan Erik Vold (1990) Samlede Dikt (Oslo: Aschehoug)

External links
 Daria.no: Inger Hagerup
 NRK, Stemmer fra arkive:  Inger Hagerup
 NRK, Forfattere: Inger Hagerup 
  Dagbladet: Inger Hagerup 
 Hagerup at the National Library
Aschehoug agency: Inger Hagerup

1905 births
1985 deaths
20th-century Norwegian poets
Norwegian women poets
Mot Dag
Dobloug Prize winners
20th-century Norwegian dramatists and playwrights
20th-century Norwegian women writers
Norwegian women dramatists and playwrights
People from Volda